State Trunk Highway 69 (often called Highway 69, STH-69 or WIS 69) is a state highway in the U.S. state of Wisconsin. It runs north–south in south central Wisconsin from the Illinois border near Monroe to Verona.

Route description
WIS 69 begins in Green County at the Illinois border near Clarno. At the state line, WIS 69 turns into Illinois Route 26 (IL 26), which runs southward to Freeport. WIS 69 continues north to Monroe, where it runs through the city along 7th Avenue. Near the northern edge of Monroe, WIS 69 meets WIS 11 and WIS 81 at a diamond interchange. WIS 69 runs concurrently with WIS 11 and WIS 81, temporarily going east–west rather than its natural north–south direction, for about half a mile. This segment is the only limited-access freeway stretch of WIS 69. WIS 69 splits off at another diamond interchange just east of the first, and turns back northward towards Monticello. WIS 69 passes west of downtown through Monticello. Between Monticello and New Glarus, WIS 69 passes by New Glarus Woods State Park and the New Glarus Brewing Company, the second largest brewing company in Wisconsin. In New Glarus, WIS 69 intersects WIS 39 just east of downtown, before exiting the community to the north.  north of New Glarus, WIS 69 enters Dane County.

WIS 69 and WIS 92 enter Belleville on Main Street, passing straight through downtown. WIS 69 then turns northward onto River Street, while WIS 92 stays on Main Street for one more block. After turning onto River Street, WIS 69 crosses the Sugar River and passes by Lake Belle View before continuing northward out of the community. WIS 69 passes through the unincorporated communities of Basco and Paoli before reaching the south edge of Verona, where it terminates at a diamond interchange with US 18 and US 151.

WIS 69 is a major two-lane highway for the vast majority of its route, connecting the Madison metropolitan area with Monroe and, via IL 26, Freeport, in addition to serving a few smaller communities. Though WIS 69 is largely two lanes, there are two four lane segments—in Monroe along 7th Avenue and the WIS 11/WIS 81 concurrency, and approaching the US 18/US 151 interchange in Verona.

Major intersections

See also

References

External links

069
Transportation in Green County, Wisconsin
Transportation in Dane County, Wisconsin